Hendrikus Rutgerus Bernardus Maria (Henk) Kummeling (born 10 January 1961 in Pannerden) is a Dutch professor of law. From 2005 until 2016 he was chair of the Dutch National Electoral Council. Since 2018 he is rector of Utrecht University.

Kummeling studied law at the Radboud University Nijmegen where he obtained a PhD in 1988 under the supervision of Constantijn Kortmann. He worked as a scientist at the Radboud University Nijmegen and Utrecht University. In 1994 he was appointed parttime professor of Constitutional Law and Administrative Law at Tilburg University. In 1995 he was appointed full professor of Constitutional Law and Comparative Constitutional Law at Utrecht University, where he was dean of the Faculty of Law, Economics and Governance from 2008 until 2014.  In 2015 he was appointed distinguished professor of Utrecht University (Dutch: universiteitshoogleraar), which is a Dutch honorary university function. Since 1 June 2018 Kummeling is rector of Utrecht University.

From 2005 until 2016 he was chair of the Dutch National Electoral Council (Dutch: kiesraad), the highest electoral authority in the Netherlands.

References

Academic staff of Utrecht University
Dutch legal scholars
Rectors of universities in the Netherlands
1961 births
Living people